Tate County is a county located in the northwestern portion of the U.S. state of Mississippi. As of the 2020 census, the population was 28,064. Its county seat is Senatobia. Organized in 1873 during the Reconstruction era, from portions of DeSoto, Marshall, and Tunica counties, the county is named for Thomas Simpson Tate, one of the first prominent American settlers of the area.

Tate County is part of the Memphis, TN-MS-AR Metropolitan Statistical Area. This fertile river valley was developed for cotton cultivation in the 19th century.

History

As it was developed for cotton culture in the antebellum years, planters in the county depended on the labor of African American slaves. Blacks comprised a majority of the population for many decades. After Reconstruction, whites sometimes enforced their dominance through political intimidation or violence against blacks.

In 1932, a deputy sheriff and son of County Sheriff C.A. Williams, was allegedly shot by a black man, Jesse Williams. Sheriff Williams illegally organized a posse and murdered at least five and possibly as many as seven black people, family members of a man known as "Judge" Crawford. A month later Jesse Williams was caught, "tried" and lynched by hanging. No charges were ever considered against the sheriff or lynch mob.

Geography

It is the third-smallest county in Mississippi by land area.

Major highways

  Interstate 55
  U.S. Route 51
  Mississippi Highway 3
  Mississippi Highway 4
  Mississippi Scenic Highway 304
  Mississippi Highway 305
  Mississippi Highway 306
  Mississippi Highway 740

Adjacent counties
 DeSoto County (north)
 Marshall County (east)
 Lafayette County (southeast)
 Panola County (south)
 Tunica County (west)

Demographics

2020 census

As of the 2020 United States Census, there were 28,064 people, 10,324 households, and 7,580 families residing in the county.

2000 census
As of the census of 2000, there were 25,370 people, 8,850 households, and 6,717 families residing in the county. There were 9,354 housing units at an average density of 23 per square mile (9/km2). The racial makeup of the county was 67.84% White, 31.02% Black or African American, 0.20% Native American, 0.10% Asian, 0.04% Pacific Islander, 0.25% from other races, and 0.56% from two or more races.  0.88% of the population were Hispanic or Latino of any race.

There were 8,850 households, out of which 36.10% had children under the age of 18 living with them, 56.00% were married couples living together, 15.50% had a female householder with no husband present, and 24.10% were non-families. 21.30% of all households were made up of individuals, and 9.10% had someone living alone who was 65 years of age or older.  The average household size was 2.74 and the average family size was 3.18.

As of 2000, the county's population was spread out, with 27.10% under the age of 18, 11.70% from 18 to 24, 27.50% from 25 to 44, 22.30% from 45 to 64, and 11.40% who were 65 years of age or older.  The median age was 34 years. For every 100 females there were 93.70 males.  For every 100 females age 18 and over, there were 90.50 males.

The median income for a household in the county was $35,836, and the median income for a family was $41,423. Males had a median income of $33,064 versus $21,154 for females. The per capita income for the county was $16,154.  About 10.60% of families and 13.50% of the population were below the poverty line, including 14.20% of those under age 18 and 21.10% of those age 65 or over.

Communities

City
 Senatobia (county seat)

Town
 Coldwater

Census-designated places
 Arkabutla
 Independence
 Strayhorn

Unincorporated communities

 Cottonville
 Looxahoma
 Sarah
 Savage
 Thyatira
 Tyro

Politics

Notable people
 Actor James Earl Jones was born in Arkabutla, Mississippi, an unincorporated area of Tate County and lived here for five years. He was sent north to live with his maternal grandparents on their farm in Jackson, Michigan.

See also
 Dry counties
 National Register of Historic Places listings in Tate County, Mississippi
 Northwest Mississippi Community College
 U.S.S. Tate

References

External links
 Tate County Economic Development Foundation
 The Democrat - Weekly newspaper serving Tate County.
 Tate County Sheriff

 
Mississippi counties
Counties in the Memphis metropolitan area
1873 establishments in Mississippi
Populated places established in 1873
Lynching deaths in Mississippi